Thomas Smith (born 26 August 1848) was an English cricketer. He was a right-handed batsman and a right-arm medium-pace round-arm bowler who played first-class cricket for Lancashire. He was born in Glossop.

Playing his club cricket with Cheetham Hill, Smith made two first-class appearances in 1867. His first, against Surrey, saw him score twelve runs in the single innings in which Lancashire were called to bat, and saw him bowl 15 overs.

Smith's second and final appearance came as an opening batsman in a defeat against Marylebone Cricket Club, in which he bowled economically, but failed to impress with the bat.

Smith later umpired two games during the 1880 season.

External links
Thomas Smith at Cricket Archive

1848 births
People from Glossop
Cricketers from Derbyshire
English cricketers
Lancashire cricketers
Year of death missing